Leo Najera (born 14 July 1971) is a Filipino swimmer. He competed in three events at the 1992 Summer Olympics.

References

1971 births
Living people
Filipino male swimmers
Olympic swimmers of the Philippines
Swimmers at the 1992 Summer Olympics
Place of birth missing (living people)